Dale Patrick Kelly (born August 27, 1955) is an American former professional baseball catcher and current coach. He played in Major League Baseball (MLB) for the Toronto Blue Jays.

Career
Drafted in the third round of  amateur draft, his career in the majors consisted of three games. Kelly made his MLB debut with the Toronto Blue Jays on May 28, and played his final game six days later. In seven at-bats, he had two hits, for a .286 batting average, with no home runs or RBIs. Kelly batted and threw right-handed.

On July 3, 2007, Kelly replaced Bucky Dent as the Cincinnati Reds bench coach on an interim basis.

On June 5, 2008, Kelly's son Casey was the 30th selection of the first round, by the Boston Red Sox in the MLB's First Year Player Draft. Pat's older son, Chris, played in the Tampa Bay Rays farm system.

In January 2014, Kelly replaced Ken Griffey Sr. as the manager of the Reds' Single High-Class A California League affiliate in Bakersfield, California. Kelly had managed the Reds' Rookie League team in Billings, Montana in 2013.

In December 2014, Kelly was named manager of the Reds' Double-A affiliate, the Pensacola Blue Wahoos. On April 18, 2018, Kelly once again became the interim bench coach for the Reds.

In January 2019, Kelly was named manager of the Reds' Double-A affiliate, the Chattanooga Lookouts. He was named the manager of the Louisville Bats prior to the 2020 season.

Facts
In between, Kelly played winter ball with the Cardenales de Lara club of the Venezuelan League in the 1977–1978 season, and also managed the Indios de Mayagüez of Puerto Rico to the 1992 Caribbean Series championship title. He also played for the Bradenton Explorers of the Senior Professional Baseball Association in its 1989 inaugural season.

References

External links

1955 births
Living people
American expatriate baseball players in Canada
Atlanta Braves scouts
Baseball coaches from California
Baseball players from California
Billings Mustangs managers
Bradenton Explorers players
Cardenales de Lara players
American expatriate baseball players in Venezuela
Caribbean Series managers
Chattanooga Lookouts managers
Cincinnati Reds coaches
Durham Bulls players
El Paso Diablos players
Florence Blue Jays players
Glens Falls White Sox players
Idaho Falls Angels players
Indianapolis Indians managers
Kinston Eagles players
Knoxville Blue Jays players
Las Vegas 51s managers
Louisville Bats managers
Major League Baseball bench coaches
Major League Baseball catchers
Minor league baseball coaches
Quad Cities Angels players
Reno Padres players
Salinas Packers players
Salinas Angels players
Savannah Braves players
Sportspeople from Santa Maria, California
Syracuse Chiefs managers
Toronto Blue Jays players
Toronto Blue Jays scouts